Bernadotte Township is one of twenty-six townships in Fulton County, Illinois, USA.  As of the 2010 census, its population was 273 and it contained 141 housing units.

Geography

Extinct towns
 Bernadotte
 Tuscumbia
 Cameron Grove (aka Colemans grove) was a picnic area & settlement 3 miles up the spoon River north of Bernadotte in the early days.
 Providence was a small community with a lovely church and cemetery.
 Bennington was a former village that had a post office established  Sept 20,1823 and discontinued May 20, 1835.

Cemeteries
The township contains these four cemeteries: Engle, Providence, Randol and Stites.

Landmarks
 Camp Ellis Landing Strip

Demographics

School districts
 Community Unit School District 3 Fulton City
 Lewistown School District 97
 V I T Community Unit School District 2

Political districts
 Illinois's 17th congressional district
 State House District 94
 State Senate District 47

References
 
 United States Census Bureau 2007 TIGER/Line Shapefiles
 United States National Atlas

External links
 City-Data.com
 Illinois State Archives

Townships in Fulton County, Illinois
Townships in Illinois